The Ahklun Mountains are located in the northeast section of the Togiak National Wildlife Refuge in southwest Alaska. They extend southwest from the Kanektok and Narogurum Rivers to Hagemeister Strait and Kuskokwim Bay and support the only existing glaciers in western Alaska. They are the highest Alaskan mountain range west of the Alaska Range and north of the Alaska Peninsula: some summits in the range have many glaciers. To the west is the Kuskokwim River and to the east are the Bristol Bay lowlands.

The mountains cover approximately 80 percent of the Togiak National Wildlife Refuge. The refuge also contains tundra and coastal plains.

Environment

The Ahklun Mountains are dominated by alpine tundra, heath, and barrens, while moist sedge-tussock meadows occur in valley bottoms. Black spruce forest occurs on some hills and ridges. Forests of white spruce, paper birch, and alder cover the low hills along the major rivers. Blackpoll warblers are common breeders in conifer stands in river valleys. Beaver are abundant, supporting a large annual harvest. Sockeye salmon are the most abundant fish. Chum, king, silver salmon, and rainbow trout are also numerous. The growing season extends approximately from May 15 to September 10.

Glaciers

The glaciers were first mapped by the U.S. Geological Survey, who used photogrammetry methods based on a
1972 series of aerial photos, revealing the presence of 116 glaciers. In 2006, 109 of these glaciers were resurveyed with the existence of 97 verified and 12 thought to have disappeared. This showed that over just three decades there had been a large decrease in the amount of land area covered by glacial ice in these mountains. The scientific community has long recognized the importance of glaciers as indicators of climatic change.

In 2015, researchers analyzed aerial and satellite images from 1957, 1984, and 2009. They found that 10 out of 109 of the glaciers of the Ahklun Mountains originally mapped by the U.S. Geological Survey in the 1970s had completely disappeared. They also compared the size of the glaciers using aerial photographs and satellite images and found that the glaciers had lost about 50 percent of their total area. At this rate of melting, they predict that all of the glaciers in the Ahklun Mountains will be gone by the end of this century.

Geological evidence show that during the Pleistocene era there were repeated glaciations that have carved out a large number of valley troughs. On the southern and western side, the valleys are broader and are interspersed with rolling uplands pierced  by rugged massifs.

Lowlands
In the lowlands,  areas not reached by the glaciation, the principal geographic features are the  moraines and  ridges formed by thrusting ice.

Notes

External links

 

Landforms of Bethel Census Area, Alaska
Landforms of Dillingham Census Area, Alaska
Mountains of Unorganized Borough, Alaska
Mountain ranges of Alaska
Mountains of Alaska